Carlos Neva Tey (born 12 June 1996) is a Spanish footballer who plays for Granada CF as a left back.

Club career
Neva was born in El Puerto de Santa María, Cádiz, Andalusia, and made his senior debut for Racing Club Portuense on 21 April 2013, in a 0–1 Tercera División away loss against Ayamonte CF. On 12 May he scored his first senior goal, in a 2–1 home defeat of CA Ceuta.

In July 2014, Neva joined Real Madrid's youth setup, but was deemed surplus to requirements and moved to Sevilla FC in September. He renewed his contract with the latter side the following 8 July, being promoted to the C-team.

On 26 July 2016, Neva signed for Marbella FC in Segunda División B. Roughly one year later, he agreed to a deal with Granada CF and was assigned to the reserves also in the third division.

Neva made his professional debut on 8 June 2019, coming on as a second-half substitute for Fran Rico in a 2–1 home win against AD Alcorcón in the Segunda División championship. On 15 August, he renewed his contract until 2021 and was definitely promoted to the main squad, now in La Liga.

Neva made his debut in the top tier on 21 September 2019, starting in a 2–0 home win against FC Barcelona, and subsequently profitted from injuries of starter Álex Martínez to establish himself as a first-choice during the campaign. On 23 July 2020, he further extended his contract until 2022.

Career statistics

Club

References

External links
Real Madrid profile 

1996 births
Living people
People from El Puerto de Santa María
Sportspeople from the Province of Cádiz
Spanish footballers
Footballers from Andalusia
Association football defenders
La Liga players
Segunda División players
Segunda División B players
Tercera División players
Racing Club Portuense players
Sevilla FC C players
Marbella FC players
Club Recreativo Granada players
Granada CF footballers